The little grey flycatcher (Muscicapa epulata) or little grey alseonax, is a species of bird in the family Muscicapidae.
It is found throughout the African tropical rainforest.
Its natural habitat is subtropical or tropical moist lowland forests.

References

little grey flycatcher
Birds of the African tropical rainforest
little grey flycatcher
Taxonomy articles created by Polbot